Eva Eriksson, born on 13 May 1949 in Halmstad, Sweden is a Swedish illustrator and writer. She has illustrated several children's books  by writers including Barbro Lindgren and Viveca Lärn. Some of her illustrated books have also been translated into the English language by Gecko Press and other publishers. 

She educated herself at Konstfack in Stockholm. Between 2003-2012 she held seat number 1 of the Swedish Academy for Children's Books.

Select bibliography
2006: All the Dear Little Animals, written by Ulf Nilsson 32pp., 
2009: When We Were Alone in the World, written by Ulf Nilsson, 32pp., 
2014: My Heart is Laughing, written by Rose Lagercrantz, 120pp.,  
2015: When I Am Happiest, written by Rose Lagercrantz, 128pp.,  
2015: When Dad Showed Me the Universe, written by Ulf Stark. 32pp., 
2016: The Midsummer Tomte and the Little Rabbits, written by Ulf Stark. 120pp., 
2016: The Yule Tomte and the Little Rabbits, written by Ulf Stark. 104pp., 
2017: Little Sister Rabbit and the Fox, written by Ulf Nilsson. 32pp., 
2017: Little Sister Rabbit Gets Lost, written by Ulf Nilsson. 32pp.,

Awards
1981: Elsa Beskow plaque
1981: Expressens Heffalump
1983: BMF Children's plaque (together with Ulf Nilsson ) for the Little Sister Rabbit
1985: BMF Children's plaque (together with Viveca Lärn ) for We sneak in Enoch
1986: Raben & Sjogren signs scholarship
1998: BMF Children's Plaque for Malla's
1999: Knut V Pettersson -stipendiat
2001: Astrid Lindgren Prize
2006: Ottilia Adelborg Prize
2008: Emil Prize

References

External links

 
English information page

1949 births
Living people
Swedish women illustrators
Swedish illustrators
Swedish children's book illustrators
Swedish women children's writers
Swedish children's writers